is a Japanese manga series written and illustrated by Gamon Sakurai. It was serialized in Kodansha's seinen manga magazine Good! Afternoon from July 2012 to February 2021 and was collected into seventeen volumes. In North America, it has been licensed for English release by Vertical.

It was adapted into a 3D anime film trilogy by Polygon Pictures between November 2015 and September 2016. An anime television series adaptation, also by Polygon Pictures, aired between January and April 2016, with a second season aired from October to December 2016. A live-action film adaptation was released in September 2017.

Plot
Ajin presents the story of a student named Nagai Kei, who discovers he is an "Ajin" when he is fatally wounded in a traffic accident. In the world of Ajin, a small number of humans (termed "Ajin") possess immortality and extreme regenerative abilities that trigger upon death, allowing them to completely recover from any mortal injury in a matter of seconds. Ajin can also create "black ghosts", highly dangerous combat-oriented entities that are only visible to other Ajin. "Black ghosts" are resistant to physical injury, exhibit extraordinary physical strength, and have sharp teeth and claws. Different "black ghosts" have varying degrees of intelligence: most are completely reliant on their Ajin for directions, and others, such as Kei's, are more independent and likely to engage in self-initiated actions.

Consequently, Ajin are considered dangerous and inhuman by the public, and most are captured by governments. Governments claim to protect Ajin, but in reality, most use them as subjects for cruel and inhumane experiments, as their abilities to completely recover from fatal wounds provides an unlimited source of organs and bodies in dangerous tests (such as live-fire weapons testing). As a result, Ajin that have escaped from government custody (such as Satou, the main antagonist) are bent on exacting revenge from governments. Kei, however, wants no part in the emerging Ajin-human conflict, but forms an agreement with Japanese governmental agents to fight against Satou in exchange for his freedom from government experimentation.

Characters

Kei's Group

Played by: Takeru Satoh
Kei first discovers that he is an Ajin after being killed in a traffic accident. To his peers, he appears to be a normal and carefree student, but in reality he is emotionally detached from other people and often willing to endanger the lives of other people in order for him to accomplish his own goals. He differs from most Ajin as he has the ability to create an abnormally large amount of IBM (Invisible Black Matter, which is key to an Ajin's regeneration and ability to create "black ghosts"), allowing Kei to manifest more "black ghosts" than his Ajin peers. According to Ikuya, he is implied to have manifested his Ajin-related abilities at a very young age.

A close friend of Kei who helps him to escape from the police. He was later sent to prison for assisting in Kei's escape and later befriends Takeshi, another Ajin, allowing Kaito to escape imprisonment.

Kō is an Ajin and a partner of Kei with the intention to stop Satō, as Satō's plans for the creation of an Ajin-led government will lead to the loss of many human lives. Unlike Kei, who is indifferent and cold to others, Kō values friendship and is willing to put the safety of others above his own. He is also physically fitter than Kei, but lacks Kei's intellectual capabilities, often relying on Kei for planning in combat operations, with him acting as the "muscle" of the operation. Kō has the rapid regenerative abilities common to Ajin, but lacks the ability to manifest his own "black ghost".

Ministry of Health, Labour and Welfare

Played by: Tetsuji Tamayama
Yū is the head of Ajin Research under the Ministry of Health, Labour and Welfare and has a comatose fiancée, Ai. He is protected by an Ajin bodyguard named Izumi Shimomura. He agrees to let Kei work with him to stop Satō on the condition that Kei is allowed to live a normal life afterwards. 
 / 

Played by: Rina Kawaei
Izumi is a stoic and taciturn Ajin working for Yū Tosaki at the Ministry of Health, Labour and Welfare. Izumi's birth name is Yōko Tainaka. As Yōko, she first discovered her Ajin abilities in her teenage years, when she first died after defending herself from a rape attempt of an abusive stepfather. Yōko would run away from home, where she is eventually recruited by Yū as a bodyguard under a special contract. The contract allowed Yōko to adopt the alias of "Izumi Shinomura", such that "Yōko Tainaka" is legally deceased and that "Izumi Shimomura" is a separate identity. She affectionately refers to her “black ghost” as “Kuro”.

Yū's junior at the Ministry who was also assigned to supervise Yū. After Yū decides to defy orders from the Minister of Health, Labour and Welfare, Sokabe was appointed as his successor.

Ajin
 / 

Played by: Gō Ayano
The leader of the pro-Ajin movement, also known as  due to his signature flat cap hat, Satō is a calm and collected individual who is well-known within the Ministry of Health, Labour and Welfare as the most dangerous Ajin. Despite his appearance as a genial old man who enjoys video gaming, he is in reality a sinister, calculating tactician with combat experience as a former special-operations soldier in the USMC. Satō originally claims that he wishes to protest against the mistreatment of Ajins worldwide, but it is later revealed that he uses this claim as an excuse to gather an army of Ajin under his command to create an immortal army to rule Japan and simply for the sake of violence and destruction. He is frequently described as a "player" in the latter half of the anime, as he is prone to using strategies adapted from video games to carry out assassinations of famous politicians in order to force negotiations with the government for allowing rights of Ajins. He enjoys the use of violence against anybody (human or Ajin) who attempts to disrupt his plans and is especially irked by provocation.

Played by: Yu Shirota
He is the second Ajin to be discovered in Japan. He was rescued by Satō from brutal experimentation and joins in with his pro-Ajin movement against the Japanese government.
 

Played by: Yudai Chiba
Masumi is one of the few Ajins who accepts Satō's invitation to use genocide to fight for Ajins' rights. He is a skilled hacker knowledgeable in weaponry and machines. In the anime, he eventually betrays Satō and reaches out to Kei in order to defeat him.
 

A prisoner who had escaped from jail after seeing Sato's announcement to protest for Ajins' rights. Takeshi becomes Kaito's partner after Kaito helped him when he was bullied by the other prisoners wanting to know how he had escaped from jail. His IBM is shown to have wings, which was his means of escape from prison. After he and Kai reconcile he promises to let Kai use his IBM to escape prison if, for whatever reason, he wishes to escape in order to assist Kei. In the anime, Takeshi uses his IBM to bring himself as well as Kai to Eriko's hospital in order to save both her and Kei from the riots occurring there.

Others

Played by: Minami Hamabe
Kei’s sister who seems to suffer from a terminal illness and is hospitalized throughout most of the series.

He is a Japanese-American researcher who studied Ajins in the United States and has a great deal of knowledge about them.

Media

Manga
Ajin: Demi-Human is written and illustrated by Gamon Sakurai. Initially, it was written by Tsuina Miura, however, his name is not mentioned in the credits after the first volume, and Gamon Sakurai has been creating the manga himself since. The series was published in Kodansha's seinen manga magazine Good! Afternoon from July 6, 2012 to February 5, 2021 and was collected into seventeen volumes. 

In February 2014, Vertical announced that it had licensed the series for English release. On March 15, 2014, Crunchyroll began to release the series on their manga service under the title Ajin: Demi-Human, starting with the first two chapters.

Volume list

Film
Plans to adapt the series into an anime film trilogy were announced in June 2015. The films were directed by Hiroaki Andō and written by Hiroshi Seko, with animation by Polygon Pictures. The first film, titled Ajin: Shōdō (Ajin: Impulse), debuted in Japan on November 27, 2015. This film is a compilation of the first six episodes of the TV series. The second film, titled Ajin: Shōtotsu (Ajin: Collision), debuted in Japan on May 6, 2016, and the third and final film in the trilogy, titled Ajin: Shōgeki (Ajin: Clash), was released on September 23, 2016.

Anime

A television series that follows the anime films premiered on January 16, 2016. It is produced by the staff that produced the film trilogy. It aired on MBS, TBS, CBC and BS-TBS, with 13 episodes. The series was streamed by Netflix, starting on April 12, 2016, along with English, French, Spanish, German and Brazilian Portuguese dubs. The series is licensed by Sentai Filmworks for home video release in North America. An OAD was bundled with the manga's 8th limited edition volume, which was released on May 6, 2016. A second OAD was bundled with manga's 9th limited edition volume, which was released on October 7, 2016. A third OAD was bundled with manga's 10th limited edition volume, which was released on April 7, 2017. A second season premiered on October 8, 2016 and continued the original numbering sequence. The second season premiered on Netflix on December 27, 2016.

Live-action film
The production of a live-action film was announced in November 2016, with release on September 30, 2017. The director is Katsuyuki Motohiro, with Takeru Satoh in the lead role. The action scenes were planned by the team behind the Rurouni Kenshin films, which also starred Satoh. The additional cast includes Tetsuji Tamayama, Rina Kawaei, Minami Hamabe, Yuu Shirota, Yudai Chiba and Yuki Yamada.

Reception
The Japanese manga news site Comic Natalie awarded the series third place in its poll of the best manga in 2013. The third volume ranked 6th on the Oricon manga chart on the week of its release. In a survey of 400 manga and publishing professionals for the manga guidebook Kono Manga ga Sugoi!, the series was rated 3rd place in a list of top 20 manga for Male readers. The manga had over 4 million copies in print as of December 2015.

The series was listed as a nominee for the Readers Award in the 18th Tezuka Osamu Cultural Prize, and in the General category in the 38th Kodansha Manga Awards.

Notes

References

External links
 at Monthly Afternoon 
 
 at Netflix

Action anime and manga
Anime series based on manga
Animeism
Dark fantasy anime and manga
Kodansha manga
Manga adapted into films
Manga adapted into television series
Netflix original anime
Polygon Pictures
Seinen manga
Sentai Filmworks
Supernatural thriller anime and manga
Vertical (publisher) titles